Nikolay Dmitrievich Arsenyev (b. circa. 1739 – d. 1796) was a major-general of the Russian Empire, who served during the reign of Catherine the Great (r. 1762–1796). He fought at the Russo-Turkish War of 1768-74, the Russo-Turkish War of 1787-92, the Polish–Russian War of 1792 as well as the Kościuszko Uprising.

Career
Nikolay Arsenyev was born around 1739, but according to Prof. Alexander Mikaberidze, the exact date of his birth is unclear. He started his military career in 1760, when he enlisted into the Preobrazhensky Regiment, one of the oldest guard/elite regiments of the Imperial Russian Army. Several years later, he would fight his first war, namely the Russo-Turkish War of 1768-74, and engaged at the battles of Kafa (1771) and Obashtu (1773). In 1780, he was promoted to colonel (polkovnik), seven years later, in 1778, to brigadier, and lastly on 16 February 1790 to major general. During the Russo-Turkish War of 1768-74, he participated in the siege of Izmail, and fought at Tulcea as well. For his deeds at the successful siege of Izmail, he was awarded the Order of Saint George (3rd class) on 5 April 1791. Soon after, he was moved to participate in the Polish–Russian War of 1792 and the relatively shortly ensuing Kościuszko Uprising, led by Tadeusz Kościuszko. In these two years in Poland (1792-1794), Arsenyev fought at several battles, namely those at Nesvizh, Slutsk, as well as Brest-Litovsk. For his deeds at this front, he received the Order of Saint Vladimir (2nd class). However, on 20 April 1794, he was captured by the Poles. He would remain in captivity until the Russians took the city later that same year.

References

Sources
 
 
 

1739 births
1796 deaths
Imperial Russian major generals
Russian people of the Polish–Russian War of 1792
Russian people of the Kościuszko Uprising
Recipients of the Order of St. George of the Third Degree
Recipients of the Order of St. Vladimir, 2nd class
Prisoners of war from the Russian Empire